W31EL-D is a low-power television station in Baton Rouge, Louisiana, broadcasting locally on UHF channel 48 as an owned-and-operated satellite repeater for the Daystar Television Network.

A deal was reached by the Trinity Broadcasting Network to sell K48IT to Word of God Fellowship, owner of the Daystar Television Network, on March 19, 2010. Following the sale, the station's call letters changed to KBDT-LP and it switched from TBN to Daystar. The station's call sign changed again on June 19, 2012, to W48DW-D. The station temporarily went off the air during the digital TV spectrum allocation and came back in mid-2021 on channel 31, W31EL-D, with PSIP rerouting the station to channel 48.

References

External links

Daystar (TV network) affiliates
Television channels and stations established in 1999
Low-power television stations in the United States
1999 establishments in Louisiana